State Road 93 (SR 93) is the unsigned Florida Department of Transportation designation for most of Interstate 75 (I-75) in Florida. It runs from the Georgia state line to the interchange with the Palmetto Expressway and the Gratigny Parkway in Miami Lakes near the Opa-locka, Florida, Airport.

In the Tampa-St. Petersburg area, SR 93 is the hidden FDOT designation of Interstate 275 as it traverses Tampa Bay along the Sunshine Skyway Bridge, crosses Old Tampa Bay on the Howard Frankland Bridge before intersecting with Interstate 4 (unsigned SR 400) at the historical southern terminus of I-75 before continuing northward to rejoin the parent route near Lutz.

State Road 93A
While I-275 goes toward the shore of the Gulf of Mexico in the Tampa-St. Petersburg area, I-75 bypasses the region by veering inland. Originally Interstate 75E, the stretch of I-75 from Lutz to Gillette has the unsigned FDOT designation of State Road 93A.

References

093
093
093
093
093
093
093
093
093
093
093
093
093
093
093
093
093
093
093
Florida